Kurkino is the name of several inhabited localities in Russia.

Urban localities
Kurkino, Tula Oblast, an urban-type settlement in Kurkinsky District of Tula Oblast

Rural localities
Kurkino, Kaluga Oblast, a village in Yukhnovsky District of Kaluga Oblast
Kurkino, Krasnoyarsk Krai, a village in Cheremushinsky Selsoviet of Karatuzsky District of Krasnoyarsk Krai
Kurkino, Kursk Oblast, a selo in Kamyshinsky Selsoviet of Kursky District of Kursk Oblast
Kurkino, Moscow Oblast, a village in Seredinskoye Rural Settlement of Shakhovskoy District of Moscow Oblast
Kurkino, Pskov Oblast, a village in Kunyinsky District of Pskov Oblast
Kurkino, Ryazan Oblast, a village in Iskrovsky Rural Okrug of Ryazansky District of Ryazan Oblast
Kurkino, Smolensk Oblast, a village in Novoduginskoye Rural Settlement of Novoduginsky District of Smolensk Oblast
Kurkino, Republic of Tatarstan, a village in Kukmorsky District of the Republic of Tatarstan
Kurkino, Tver Oblast, a village in Kalininsky District of Tver Oblast
Kurkino, Nefedovsky Selsoviet, Vologodsky District, Vologda Oblast, a village in Nefedovsky Selsoviet of Vologodsky District of Vologda Oblast
Kurkino, Oktyabrsky Selsoviet, Vologodsky District, Vologda Oblast, a selo in Oktyabrsky Selsoviet of Vologodsky District of Vologda Oblast